Amdibyana is a small village located in Jayshan District, Abyan Governorate, Yemen. According to the 2004 Yemen Census, the population of the village was 80.

As of 2014, the population of the village reached 107.

References 

 National Information Center, Yemen.
 Comprehensive guide to all regions in Yemen - دليلك الشامل إلي اليمن، كل مناطقها.

Abyan Governorate